Sylvia Bambala Chalikosa (born 29 March 1964) is a Zambian politician, a member of the Patriotic Front. She is the Member of Parliament for Mpika Central constituency and she is currently the Minister of Works and Supply.

Career 
Chalikosa worked as an accountant at SawPower Company Limited. On August 11, 2016, she was elected as the Patriotic Front (PF) candidate to contest for a seat in the National Assembly of Zambia and represent the constituency Mpika Central. After being a member of the National Security Committee and Foreign Affairs Committee of the National Assembly, she was appointed by President Edgar Lungu to his cabinet in October 2016 and took over the post of Minister for Vice President Inonge Wina. In 2019, she was transferred by president Edgar Chagwa Lungu to the office of the Ministry of Works and Supply.

References

1964 births
Living people
Patriotic Front (Zambia) politicians
Women government ministers of Zambia
Zambian politicians